Ranjeet Singh is a Pakistani politician who is a member for the Provincial Assembly of Khyber Pakhtunkhwa.

Political career
He was elected to Provincial Assembly of Khyber Pakhtunkhwa on a reserved seat for minorities in 2018 Pakistani general election representing Muttahida Majlis-e-Amal.

References

Living people
Muttahida Majlis-e-Amal politicians
Politicians from Khyber Pakhtunkhwa
Year of birth missing (living people)
Pakistani Sikhs